Magdangal is a surname. Notable people with the surname include:

Gian Magdangal (born 1981), Filipino singer and actor
Jolina Magdangal (born 1978), Filipino singer, actress, television presenter, and entrepreneur, cousin of Gian

Tagalog-language surnames